Palanca is a commune in Drochia District, Moldova. It is composed of three villages: Holoșnița Nouă, Palanca and Șalvirii Noi. At the 2004 census, the commune had 901 inhabitants.

References

Communes of Drochia District